Savannah is a super-yacht built in 2015 at the Dutch Feadship yard in Aalsmeer.

The yacht blends a single diesel engine, three gensets, batteries, propeller, and azimuting pioneering electro-mechanical propulsion platform. This combination offers fuel savings of thirty percent.

Savannah is designed in a collaboration between De Voogt Naval Architects and CG Design.

Design 
The hull is steel, while the superstructure is made out of aluminium with teak laid decks. The yacht is Lloyd's registered, issued in the Cayman Islands.

Prizes 
At the 2016 Showboats Design Awards, Savannah won multiple prizes.
 Exterior Design & Styling Award - Motor Yacht Above 500GT
 Interior Layout & Design Award - Motor Yacht Above 500GT 
 Holistic Design Award - Motor Yacht 

Also at the 2016 World Superyacht Awards, Savannah won multiple prizes.
 Displacement motor yachts 1,300GT to 2,999GT 
 Motor Yacht of the Year 2016

See also 
 Motor yacht
 List of motor yachts by length
 List of yachts built by Feadship

References 

2015 ships
Motor yachts
Ships built in the Netherlands